C. Thiruvenkatacharya (died 1893) was an Indian civil servant and administrator in the Madras Presidency. He served as the Diwan of Cochin kingdom from 1890 to 1893.

Career 

Thiruvenkatacharya started as a zillah judge in the Madras Presidency. In 1890,he was appointed as Diwan of Cochin kingdom and served till 1893. During this period, he tried his best to promote education. He also brought out reforms in the Postal system.

References 

 

1893 deaths
Diwans of Cochin
Year of birth missing